Hi-C may refer to:
 Hi-C, a fruit-flavored beverage brand owned by The Coca-Cola Company
 Hi-C (rapper), a Compton, California, rapper
 Hi-C (genomic analysis technique), a variant of the Chromosome conformation capture technique, used to study the conformation of an entire genome
 High Resolution Coronal Imager, a space telescope designed to take images of the sun's atmosphere
 The C (musical note) above the top of the staff in treble clef
 Hi-C, a Nashville, Tennessee, rapper

See also
 Hic (disambiguation)